This is a list of episodes from the second season of the 1967 Dragnet series. The season was directed by Jack Webb.

Broadcast history
The season originally aired Thursdays at 9:30-10:00 pm (EST).

Home media
The DVD was released by Shout! Factory.

Episodes

Dragnet (1967 series) (season 2)